Sabbatarianism advocates the observation of the Sabbath in Christianity, in keeping with the Ten Commandments. 

The observance of Sunday as a day of worship and rest is a form of first-day Sabbatarianism, a view which was historically heralded by Roman Catholics, as well as by nonconformist denominations, such as Congregationalists, Presbyterians, Methodists, Moravians, Quakers and Baptists, as well many Episcopalians. Among Sunday Sabbatarians (First-day Sabbatarians), observance of the Lord's Day often takes the form of attending the Sunday morning service of worship, receiving catechesis through Sunday School, performing acts of mercy (such as evangelism, visiting prisoners in jails and seeing the sick at hospitals), and attending the Sunday evening service of worship, as well as refraining from Sunday shopping, servile work, playing sports, viewing the television, and dining at restaurants. The impact of first-day Sabbatarianism on Western culture is manifested by practices such as Sunday blue laws. 

Seventh-day Sabbatarianism is a movement that generally embraces a literal reading of the Sabbath commandment that provides for both worship and rest on Saturday, the seventh day of the week.  Judaism has observed a sabbath on the seventh day since antiquity, following the creation account in Genesis 2 which unambiguously states that God blessed and sanctified the seventh-day, having rested on the seventh day from all his creation which God had made to do.  Seventh Day Baptists leave most other Sabbath considerations of observance to individual conscience. The Sabbatarian Adventists (Seventh-day Adventist Church, Davidian Seventh-day Adventists, Church of God (Seventh Day), and others) have similar views, but maintain the original, scriptural duration as Friday sunset through Saturday sunset. The Orthodox Tewahedo Churches in Ethiopia and Eritrea observe the seventh-day Sabbath, as well as Sunday as the Lord's Day. Likewise, the Coptic Church, another Oriental Orthodox body, "stipulates that the seventh-day Sabbath, along with Sunday, be continuously regarded as a festal day for religious celebration." The Eastern Orthodox Church also upholds that the Sabbath is still on  Saturday. Seventh-day Sabbatarianism also includes  Sabbatarian Pentecostalists (True Jesus Church, Soldiers of the Cross Church), Armstrongism, modern Judaisers (like, Hebrew Roots movement), and others.

Its historical origins lie in early Christianity, later in the Eastern Church and Irish Church, and then in Puritan Sabbatarianism, which delineated precepts for keeping Sunday, the Lord's Day, holy in observance of Sabbath commandment principles.

Non-Sabbatarianism is the view opposing all Sabbatarianism, declaring Christians to be free of mandates to follow such specific observances. It upholds the principle in Christian church doctrine that the church is not bound by such law or code, but is free to set in place and time such observances as uphold Sabbath principles according to its doctrine: to establish a day of rest, or not, and to establish a day of worship, or not, whether on Saturday or on Sunday or on some other day. It includes some nondenominational churches.

History

Theological background
Most Christian Churches, including the Roman Catholic Church, Methodist Churches and Reformed Churches, have traditionally held that law in the Old Covenant has three components: ceremonial, moral, and civil. They teach that while the ceremonial and civil (judicial) laws have been abolished, the moral law as contained in the Ten Commandments still continues to bind Christian believers. Among these Ten Commandments, which are believed by Jews and Christians to be written by the finger of God, is "Remember the sabbath day, to keep it holy." However, Jews in the tradition of Maimonides posit that anthropomorphism in the Torah, such as the use of body part names, is completely metaphorical, as human bodies are based on potencies of God, not the other way around.

The Apostolic Constitutions (ca. 380), in Section II, reveals that the early Church kept both the seventh-day Sabbath, observed on Saturday, as well as the Lord's Day, celebrated on the first-day (Sunday): "But keep the Sabbath, and the Lord’s day festival; because the former is the memorial of the creation, and the latter of the resurrection." Section VII reemphasizes this: 
In the Didache, the Twelve Apostles commanded believers to "Gather together each Sunday, break bread and give thanks, first confessing your sins, that your sacrifice may be pure."
Until the Council of Laodicea, "the Sabbath had been kept in many Christian Churches." It was upheld in the fourth century by the ancient Church of the East, as well as in the sixth century by the Celtic Churches. Gregory of Nyssa, a fourth century Church Father, implored the faithful to observe both the seventh-day Sabbath and the Lord's Day: "With what eyes do you regard the Lord's Day, you who have desecrated the Sabbath? Do you know that these two days are related, that if you wrong one of them, you will stumble against the other?" Nevertheless, Johann Lorenz von Mosheim stated that the practice of observing both the Hebrew Sabbath and the Lord's Day was principally observed in those congregations that were made up of Jewish converts to Christianity and gradually faded away; on the other hand, the observance of the Lord's Day was characteristic of all Christian assemblies.

Differences between Jewish and Christian observance
In distinguishing the observances performed on the Christian Sabbath from those performed on the Jewish Sabbath, Jonathan Edwards  wrote:

Views of Church Fathers and Reformation leaders
As early as the second century, Irenaeus, who was a disciple of Polycarp, himself a disciple of John the Apostle, "On the Lord’s day every one of us Christians keep the Sabbath, meditating on the law, and rejoicing in the works of God." Writing in the fourth century, the early Church Father, Eusebius, taught that for Christians, "the sabbath had been transferred to Sunday". This view held by Eusebius, particularly his "interpretation of Psalm 91 (ca. 320) greatly influenced the ultimate transfer of sabbath assertions and prohibitions to the first day of the week." In "the fourth and fifth centuries theologians in the Eastern church were teaching the practical identity of the Jewish sabbath and the Christian Sunday." Saint Cæsarius of Arles (470-543) reiterated the view that "the whole glory of the Jewish Sabbath had been transferred onto Sunday, so that Christians had to keep it holy in the same way as the Jews had their own day of rest." The Council of Elvira, in A.D. 300, declared that individuals who failed to attend church for three Sundays in a row should be excommunicated until they repented of their sin. Tendencies towards Sabbatarianism began to resurface very early in the Reformation (early 16th century), causing some of the first Protestants, Luther and Calvin among them, to deny the need for legal codes and accept the non-Sabbatarian principles long established in Christianity.

Rejection of Saturday as the Sabbath 
The Western Christian Church came to reject the observance of the Hebrew Sabbath on Saturday, calling its legalisms Judaizing; in the late 4th century, the 29th canon of the Council of Laodicea finally declared that Christians must not rest on the Jewish Sabbath, but must work on that day and if possible rest on the Lord's Day, and that any found to be Judaizers are anathema from Christ.

Alternatives to Sunday sabbath in modern churches
In Oriental Christianity, however, the Ethiopian Orthodox Church, continues to observe a two-day Sabbath (Saturday and Sunday), and many Protestant denominations, such as the Presbyterian and Methodist Churches, observe Sunday as the Christian Sabbath; in addition, the Seventh-day Adventists and Seventh Day Baptists observe Saturday as the Sabbath. Nevertheless, in the Roman Catholic Church, other Church Councils and imperial edicts "sought to restrict various activities on this day Sunday, especially public amusements in the theater and circus." Abstention from sin, in the eyes of Saint Augustine of Hippo (354-430), meant Sabbath rest from servile work on Sunday.

Ethiopian Sabbatarian movement
In the fourteenth century, "the monk Abba Ewostatewos founded a Sabbatarian movement" and fled, with his followers to "isolated parts of northwestern Ethiopia". In the Ethiopian Orthodox Tewahedo Church, "the Sabbatarian controversy divided the kingdom during the fourteenth and fifteenth centuries." Zara Yaqob, the king, eventually "decreed that the Sabbatarian teaching of the northern monks become the position of the church".
Later, the 'seventh-day Sabbatarians' (also known as 'Saturday Sabbatarians') sought to re-establish the Mosaic Law itself, along with Pharisaic interpretations and Hebrew Sabbath practices, including observances running from Friday sunset to Saturday sunset. Most identify with the early Jewish Christians, and consider early church condemnations of Judaizing to be the marks of a "Great Apostasy" in early Christianity, which they seek to rectify.

Presbyterian Scottish observation of the Sabbath
On the other hand, the Presbyterian Church of Scotland, which viewed the earlier Celtic Churches as its progenitor, promoted first-day Puritan Sabbatarian practices. In addition, first-day Sabbatarianism is historically heralded by nonconformist denominations, such as Congregationalists and Presbyterians, as well as Methodists and Baptists.

Continued dominance of Sunday sabbath
The essence of first-day Sabbatarianism, named for the Sabbath, is that it upholds the idea that Christians are bound to keep a specific code of conduct in relation to the principal day of Christian worship, or a day of rest, or both. The first-day, Puritan Sabbatarians constructed their code from their understanding of moral obligations following from their interpretation of "natural law", first defined in writings of Thomas Aquinas. Not seeking to re-establish Mosaic Law or Hebrew Sabbath practices, their connection to Judaizing was limited to the use of a legal code by which Christians might be judged.

With unwavering support by mainstream Christian denominations, Sabbatarian organizations were formed, such as the Lord's Day Alliance (founded as the American Sabbath Union) and the Sunday League of America, following the American Civil War, to preserve the importance of Sunday as the Christian Sabbath. Founded in 1888, the Lord's Day Alliance continues to state its mission as to "encourage all people to recognize and observe a day of Sabbath rest and to worship the risen Lord Jesus Christ, on the Lord’s Day, Sunday". The Board of Managers of the Lord's Day Alliance is composed of clergy and laity from Christian churches, including Baptist, Catholic, Episcopalian, Friends, Lutheran, Methodist, Non-Denominationalist, Orthodox, Presbyterian, and Reformed traditions. The Woman's Christian Temperance Union also supports first-day Sabbatarian views and worked to reflect these in the public sphere. In Canada, the Lord's Day Alliance (renamed the People for Sunday Association of Canada) was founded there and it lobbied successfully to pass in 1906 the Lord's Day Act, which was not repealed until 1985. A Roman Catholic Sunday league, the Ligue du Dimanche was formed in 1921 to promote first-day sabbatarian restrictions in Quebec, especially against movie theaters. Throughout their history, first-day Sabbatarian organizations, such as the Lord's Day Alliance, have mounted campaigns, with support in both Canada and Britain from labour unions, with the goals of preventing secular and commercial interests from hampering freedom of worship and preventing them from exploiting workers.

In the present day, 'First-day Sabbatarian' or 'Sunday Sabbatarian' is applied to those, such as the Presbyterian Churches, who teach morning and evening Sunday worship, rest from servile labour, as well as honouring the Lord's Day by refraining from shopping on Sundays, as well as refraining from participating or viewing sporting events held on Sundays, in addition to performing works of mercy on the first day. Similarly, the common term "Christian Sabbath" is sometimes used to describe the fact that most Christians assemble in worship on Sunday, and may also consider it a day of rest, aligning with the Biblical norms of the Sabbath, and even the Puritans. The Roman Catholic Church, on the other hand, makes a clear distinction or separation between the Sabbath and Sunday, arguing that the Christian observance of the Lord's Day respects the moral law of Ten Commandments as it is a fulfillment of the Hebrew Sabbath, with only the ceremonial law changing the weekly day of worship from Saturday to Sunday.

Sunday Sabbatarians

First-day Sabbatarian (Sunday Sabbatarian) practices include attending morning and evening church services on Sundays, receiving catechesis in Sunday School on the Lord's Day, taking the Lord's Day off from servile labour, not eating at restaurants on Sundays, not Sunday shopping, not using public transportation on the Lord's Day, not participating in sporting events that are held on Sundays, as well as not viewing television and the internet on Sundays; Christians who are Sunday Sabbatarians often engage in works of mercy on the Lord's Day, such as evangelism, as well as visiting prisoners at jails and the sick at hospitals and nursing homes.

Roman Catholicism 

The Roman Emperor Constantine promulgated the first known law regarding prohibition of Sunday labor for apparent religion-associated reasons in 321 AD:

Reformed Churches

The Puritans of England and Scotland brought a new rigour to the observance of the Christian Lord's Day, in reaction to the customary Sunday observance of the time, which they regarded as lax. They appealed to Sabbath ordinances with the idea that only the Bible can bind men's consciences in whether or how they will take a break from work, or to impose an obligation to meet at a particular time. Sunday Sabbatarianism is enshrined in its most mature expression, the Westminster Confession of Faith (1646), in the Calvinist theological tradition. Chapter 21, Of Religious Worship, and the Sabbath Day, sections 7-8 read:  The confession holds that not only is work forbidden in Sunday, but also "works, words, and thoughts" about "worldly employments and recreations." Instead, the whole day should be taken up with "public and private exercises of [one's] worship, and in the duties of necessity and mercy."

This statement was adopted by the Congregationalist Churches, which are descended from the Puritans, in the Savoy Declaration. The Puritans' influential reasoning spread Sabbatarianism to other Protestant denominations, such as the Methodist Churches for example, during the 17th and 18th centuries, making its way beyond the British Isles to the European continent and the New World. It is primarily through their influence that "Sabbath" has become the colloquial equivalent of "Lord's Day" or "Sunday".

Reformed Baptists, for example, uphold the 1689 Baptist Confession of Faith, which advanced the same first-day Sabbatarian obligation of the Puritan Congregationalists' Savoy Declaration.

Strict Sunday Sabbatarianism is sometimes called "Puritan Sabbath", and may be contrasted with "Continental Sabbath". The latter follows the continental reformed confessions, such as the Heidelberg Catechism, which emphasize rest and worship on the Lord's Day, but do not explicitly forbid recreational activities.  However, in practice, many continental Reformed Christians also abstain from recreation on the Sabbath, following the admonition by the Heidelberg Catechism's author Zacharaias Ursinus that "To keep holy the Sabbath, is not to spend the day in slothfulness and idleness".

The evangelical awakening in the 19th century led to a greater concern for strict Sunday observance. In 1831, the founding of the Lord's Day Observance Society was influenced by the teaching of Daniel Wilson.

Methodist Churches

Like the aforementioned Calvinist groups, the early Methodists, who were Arminian in theology, were known for "religiously keeping the Sabbath day". They regarded "keeping the Lord's Day as a duty, a delight, and a means of grace". The General Rules of the Methodist Church require "attending upon all the ordinances of God" including "the public worship of God" and prohibit "profaning the day of the Lord, either by doing ordinary work therein or by buying or selling". Methodism, however, teaches that "Christ made allowances for acts of mercy on the Lord's Day such as; nurses, doctors, etc. [Matt. 12:11; John 5:15-16]". The Sunday Sabbatarian practices of the earlier Wesleyan Methodist Church in Great Britain are described by Jonathan Crowther in A Portraiture of Methodism:

In the past, individuals who engaged in buying and selling (with exception of medicine for the sick and necessaries for funerals) on the Christian Sabbath were to be excommunicated from the Wesleyan Methodist Church according to its Discipline. Wesleyan Methodists were also encouraged to neither to hire a barber on the Lord's Day, nor to employ one who conscientiously broke the Sabbath.

Karen B. Westerfield Tucker, a United Methodist elder and theologian, writes that the Sampson Circuit of the Methodist Episcopal Church made a Sabbatarian resolution that "resounded throughout all spheres of Methodism":

Similarly in 1921, the Methodist Episcopal Church, South heralded the Sunday Sabbath as a "day of worship, meditation and prayer". It proclaimed that the "tendency to commercialize the sabbath, making it a day of traffic, travel, business and pleasure is wrong and we want to sound a word of alarm and call our people to God's way of observance". As such, the Methodist Episcopal Church, South stated that it "oppose[s] the playing of baseball, golf, and like games on that day". The 2014 Discipline of the Bible Methodist Connection of Churches states, with regard to the Lord's Day:

Reflecting the traditional Methodist standards regarding first-day Sabbabbatarianism, the 2018 Handbook for the Evangelical Wesleyan Bible Institute (EWBI), a seminary of the Evangelical Wesleyan Church, states:

The Statement of Faith of the Fellowship of Independent Methodist Churches teaches:

Moravian Church
The Moravian Covenant for Christian Living, which is the covenant taken by members of the Moravian Church, teaches:

Schwarzenau Brethren Churches
The Church Polity of the Dunkard Brethren Church, a Conservative Anabaptist denomination in the Schwarzenau Brethren tradition, teaches that "The First Day of the week is the Christian Sabbath and is to be kept as a day of rest and worship. (Matt. 28:1; Acts 20:7; John 20:1; Mark 16:2)"

Baptist Churches
First-day Sabbatarian views are embodied in the confessions of faith held by both General Baptists and Reformed Baptists. With respect to General Baptists, the Treatise on the Faith and Practice of the Free Will Baptists states:

Similarly, the Liberty Association Articles of Faith (1824), as well as the General Association Articles of Faith of both 1870 and 1949 all state:

With regard to the Particular Baptists, the Second London Baptist Confession advances first-day Sabbatarian views identical to the Westminster Confession, held by Presbyterians, and the Savoy Declaration, held by Congregationalists.

Edward L. Smither explains that first-day Sabbatarianism is the normative view held by Baptists (both General and Reformed): 

Citing , Nathan Rose, a clergyman in the Southern Baptist Church, states with regard to the Lord's Day that "for every Christian, attendance at church gatherings is not optional."  Similarly the Baptist Faith and Message, Article VIII, states "[t]he first day of the week is the Lord's Day" and that "[i]t is a Christian institution for religious observance" (though nothing forbids a congregation from holding services on Saturday evenings).

Holiness Quakerism
The Central Yearly Meeting of Friends in its Manual of Faith and Practice teaches:

Saturday and Sunday Sabbatarians 
Keith A. Burton stated that "The church in Africa [recognized] that the resurrection of Christ in no way nullified the fact that 'in six days the Lord made heaven and earth.' ...Even though the power of the Western papal legacy has made some indelible indentations on the churches of Africa, to this day they have refused to fully succumb."

Holding the teaching of Gregory of Nyssa with esteem, the Oriental Orthodox Tewahedo Churches in Eritrea and Ethiopia practice two-day sabbatarianism, observing both Saturday and Sunday as the Sabbath, commemorating the days Jesus rested in His tomb and resurrected, respectively. Similarly, the Coptic Church, another Oriental Orthodox body, "stipulates that the seventh-day Sabbath, along with Sunday, be continuously regarded as a festal day for religious celebration."

Saturday Sabbatarianism

Jews

Jewish-Christians

Seventh Day Baptists

Seventh Day Baptists are Christian Baptists who observe seventh-day Sabbath, as a holy day to God. They understand that observance is as a sign of obedience in a covenant relationship with God and not as a condition of salvation. They adopt a covenant Baptist theology, based on the concept of regenerated society, conscious baptism of believers by immersion, congregational government and the scriptural basis of opinion and practice.

The first known Seventh Day Baptist Church was the Mill Yard Church established in London, where the first service took place in 1651, led by Peter Chamberlen. M.D. "the Third". The first records of church activities were destroyed in a fire; the second record book is in possession of the Seventh Day Baptist Historical Library and Archives, the local church continues its activities to this day. Immigration to the British colonies in North America also included Seventh Day Baptists, the couple Stephen and Anne Mumford were the first Seventh Day Baptists in the Americas and with five other Baptists who kept the Sabbath, establishing in 1672 the first Seventh Day Baptist Church in the Americas. A similar occurrence in Piscataway, New Jersey in 1705 led to the formation of a sister conference among the Germans in Ephrata, Pennsylvania in about 1728. The Seventh Day Baptist General Conference united them in 1802. The Ephrata community formed the German Religious Society of Seventh Day Baptists in 1814 and its site came to be known as the Ephrata Cloister. Its last surviving resident, Marie Kachel Bucher, died on July 27, 2008, at the age of 98, but its grounds are now owned by the Commonwealth of Pennsylvania and are open to public viewing.

Embracing education where it had not yet become available to the public, the churches established schools, including three that became colleges in Alfred, New York, Milton, Wisconsin, and Salem, West Virginia. A seminary was added at Alfred University in 1871. Missionary activity in the 19th century led to expansion both in the U.S. and overseas into China, India, the Philippines, Oceania, and Africa. Today, its General Conference offices are located in Janesville, Wisconsin.

United in a literal interpretation of the Sabbath commandment to keep the seventh day holy (in worship) and to rest, Seventh Day Baptists leave other observances largely to its individual members to interpret and follow for themselves. In this way it represents the least uniform and least rigorous type of Sabbatarianism.

Seventh-day Adventism

The Seventh-day Adventist Church is the largest modern seventh-day Sabbatarian denomination, with 20,008,779 members as of June 2018, and holds the sabbath as one of the Pillars of Adventism. Seventh-day Adventism grew out of the Millerite movement in the 1840s, and a few of its founders (Cyrus Farnsworth, Frederick Wheeler, a Methodist minister and Joseph Bates, a sea captain) were convinced in 1844–1845 of the importance of Sabbatarianism under the influence of Rachel Oakes Preston, a young Seventh Day Baptist laywoman living in Washington, New Hampshire and a published article in early 1845 on the topic by Thomas M. Preble, pastor of the Free Will Baptist congregation in Nashua, New Hampshire.

Preble was the first Millerite to promote the sabbath in print form, through the February 28, 1845, issue of the Adventist Hope of Israel in Portland, Maine. In March he published his sabbath views in tract form as A Tract, Showing that the Seventh Day Should be Observed as the Sabbath, Instead of the First Day; "According to the Commandment". This tract led to the conversion of John Nevins Andrews and other Adventist families in Paris, Maine, as well as the 1845 conversion of Joseph Bates, who became the foremost proponent of the sabbath among this group. These men in turn convinced James Springer White, Ellen Harmon (later White), and Hiram Edson of New Hampshire. Preble is known to have kept seventh-day sabbath until mid-1847. He later repudiated the sabbath and opposed the Seventh-day Adventists, authoring The First-Day Sabbath.

Bates proposed an 1846 meeting among the believers in New Hampshire and Port Gibson, New York, which took place at Edson's farm, where Edson and other Port Gibson believers readily accepted the sabbath message and forged an alliance with Bates, White, and Harmon. Between April 1848 and December 1850, 22 sabbath conferences in New York and New England allowed White, Bates, Edson, and Stephen Pierce to reach conclusions about doctrinal issues.

Also in 1846, a pamphlet written by Bates created widespread interest in the sabbath. Bates, White, Harmon, Edson, Wheeler, and S. W. Rhodes led the promotion of the sabbath, partly through regular publications. Present Truth magazine was largely devoted to the sabbath at first. J. N. Andrews was the first Adventist to write a book-length defense of the sabbath, first published in 1861. Two of Andrews' books include Testimony of the Fathers of the First Three Centuries Concerning the Sabbath and the First Day and History of the Sabbath.

Traditionally, Seventh-day Adventists teach that the Ten Commandments (including the fourth commandment concerning the sabbath) are part of the moral law of God, not abrogated by the teachings of Jesus, which apply equally to Christians.  Seventh-day Adventists believe it is possible to maintain an antinomian position while at the same time faithfully observing the Ten Commandments. Adventists make a keen distinction between the "law of Moses" and the "law of God", with the former being the traditional levitical requirements intended to maintain the integrity of the ancient nation of Israel and their special role in sharing God with the rest of the world, and the latter being the universal moral code by which the universe is governed. In other words, Adventists have traditionally distinguished between "moral law" and "ceremonial law", arguing that the moral law (the Ten Commandments) continues to bind Christians, while events symbolized by the ceremonial law (the law of Moses) were fulfilled by Christ's death on the cross.

Seventh-day Adventists observe the sabbath from Friday sunset to Saturday sunset. In places where the sun does not appear or does not set for several months, such as northern Scandinavia, the tendency is to regard an arbitrary time such as 6 p.m. as "sunset". During the sabbath, Adventists avoid secular work and business, although medical relief and humanitarian work is accepted. Though there are cultural variations, most Adventists also avoid activities such as shopping, sport, and certain forms of entertainment. Adventists typically gather for church services on Saturday morning. Some also gather on Friday evening to welcome in the sabbath hours (sometimes called "vespers" or "opening Sabbath"), and some similarly gather at "closing Sabbath".

Eschatology

The pioneers of the church have traditionally taught that the seventh-day Sabbath could be a test, leading to the sealing of God's people during the end times, though there is little consensus about how this will play out. The church has traditionally taught that there could be an international Sunday law enforced by a coalition of religious and secular authorities, and that all who do not observe it will be persecuted, imprisoned or martyred. Some early Adventists were indeed jailed for working on Sunday, in violation of various local blue laws that legislated Sunday as a day of rest. It was speculated by Ellen G. White that a universal Sunday law would soon be enforced and would serve as a sign of the end times.

Eastern Orthodoxy

In Eastern Orthodoxy, the Sabbath is still considered to be on Saturday however, the day of worship is on Sunday (the Lord’s Day) which is considered to be a mini-Pascha celebration. Saturday is also considered to be a day of preparation for the Lord’s Day. Sunday worship is not considered to be a direct observance of the Sabbath. Despite that, more emphasis is put on the Lord’s Day.

Modern Seventh-day Sabbatarian groups

 Sabbatarian Baptists
 Seventh Day Baptists
 Sabbatarian Adventists
 Adventist Church of Promise
 Church of God (Seventh-Day)
 Creation Seventh Day Adventist Church
 Sabbath Rest Advent Church
 Seventh-day Adventist Church
 Seventh Day Adventist Reform Movement
 True and Free Seventh-day Adventists
 Shepherd's Rod (Davidian Seventh-day Adventists)
 United Sabbath-Day Adventist Church
 United Seventh-Day Brethren
 Sabbatarian Pentecostalists
 Nazareth Baptist Church
 Soldiers of the Cross Church
 True Jesus Church
 Sabbatarian British Israelites (Armstrongism)
 Church of God International (United States)
 Church of the Great God 
 Church of God Preparing for the Kingdom of God
 Global Church of God 
 House of Yahweh
 Intercontinental Church of God
 Living Church of God
 Philadelphia Church of God
 Restored Church of God
 United Church of God
 Judaizers
 Assemblies of Yahweh
 Black Hebrew Israelites
 African Hebrew Israelites of Jerusalem
 Church of God and Saints of Christ
 Church of God and Saints of Christ (Orthodox Christianity)
 Commandment Keepers
 Hebrew Roots Movement
 Makuya
 Messianic Judaism, some Messianic Jews observe Shabbat on Saturdays
 Sacred Name Movement
 Yahweh's Assembly in Yahshua
 Subbotniks, the majority belonged to Rabbinic and Karaite Judaism, the minority to Christianity
 Yehowists, a Russian Spiritual Christian millenarian movement founded in the 1840s
 Others
 The Christ's Assembly
 Church of Jesus Christ of Latter Day Saints (Strangite)
 Jemaat Allah Global Indonesia (JAGI), internationally known as Unitarian Christian Church of Indonesia, headquartered in Semarang, Central Java, Indonesia
 Logos Apostolic Church of God, in the UK, Kenya, Uganda, Tanzania, and Sudan
 Remnant Fellowship, headquartered in Brentwood, Tennessee and founded in 1999 by Gwen Shamblin Lara
 The Seventh-day Remnant Church
 World Mission Society Church of God

See also

 High Sabbaths
 Subbotniks

References

External links
Lord's Day Alliance of the U.S.
Lord's Day Observance Society
Keep Sunday Special
The Sabbath: A Universal and Enduring Ordinance of God by James R. Hughes - Reformed Presbyterian Church
Remembering the Lord's Day by David J. Engelsma - Protestant Reformed Churches in America
The Perpetuity and Change of the Sabbath by Jonathan Edwards (1703-1758)
Sundays are for Sabbath Rest: Explication of  Westminster Confession of Faith and the LBC1689
The Christian Week and Sabbath by Methodist theologian, Daniel D. Whedon
The Lord’s Day, the Christian Sabbath by James Chrystie - Reformed Presbyterian Church
From Sunday to Sabbath: The Puritan Origins of Modern Seventh-day Sabbatarianism

Christian terminology
Christian theological movements
Christianity and Judaism
Methodism
Mosaic law in Christian theology
Sabbath in Christianity